Brent Guerra (born 29 May 1982) is a former Australian rules football player who played with the Port Adelaide Football Club, St Kilda Football Club, and Hawthorn Football Club in the Australian Football League.

Career

Port Adelaide
Beginning his career at Port Adelaide in 2000, he was seen as a potentially dangerous winger or forward. Brent Guerra also won three SANFL Premierships with Central District. However, at the end of 2003 he was traded from the club due to Guerra wanting to return to Victoria and the Saints picked him up for pick 39, who was the unsuccessful Robert Forster-Knight.

St Kilda
Guerra was a key figure for a period during the Saints' early season run in 2004, when St Kilda won the 2004 Wizard Home Loans Cup and the first 10 games of the home and away season. He kicked 20 goals in six games, including seven in one game. From then, however, his form tapered and he finished with only nine more goals from the remaining 12 games. He was noted for a number of incidents when he shirtfronted players, including once before the opening bounce of a game (for which he was suspended).

In 2005, Guerra had another average year and, at the end of the season, the Saints delisted him.

Hawthorn
The Hawthorn Football Club selected Guerra with pick three in the 2005 AFL Pre-season draft. Guerra had a connection with Hawks' coach Alastair Clarkson from Clarkson's time as a premiership coach at Central Districts (2001) and assistant coach at Port Adelaide. Guerra was reinvented at Hawthorn as a strong-bodied half back flanker and added experience to a very young Hawks' lineup in 2006. His hard-nosed approach has at times attracted the attention of umpires. In 2007 and 2008 he averaged in excess of 20 possessions per game, displaying a consistency which was lacking earlier in his career up forward.

As a part of Hawthorn's 2008 premiership side, Guerra had 25 possessions in a reliable display.

In Round 23, 2012, a week before the finals with Hawthorn sitting on top of the ladder, Guerra sustained a hamstring injury. It occurred in the final quarter of Hawthorn's 25-point victory over West Coast.  On 24 September, Guerra ruled himself out of the 2012 Grand Final against the Sydney Swans.

Guerra was part of 2013 AFL season Goal Of The Year winner in Round 3 against Collingwood at the M.C.G. by Lance Franklin after kicking a 70 metre long torpedo from a kick in.  The ball was marked by Ben Stratton just before the centre circle, where Stratton turned to play on.  As he was tackled he handballed to Franklin, who had to hurdle over the two falling players before launching a kick from 10 metres inside the centre square.  The ball landed in the goal square and bounced straight through, taking a total of 12 seconds from start to finish to travel the 180 metre distance.

On 2 October 2013, the week following his second premiership with the Hawthorn Football Club, Guerra officially announced his retirement from AFL football to pursue a career in coaching.

Through Guerra's career he suffered from a recurring hamstring injury which kept him from playing in the 2012 Grand Final.

Guerra played for Deer Park in the Western Region Football League, from October 2013 till November 2013. He won a premiership with Deer Park in October 2014.

Guerra also made a guest stint in three games for Devonport in the Tasmanian Football League in 2014.

Coaching career
In his final year as a player, Guerra completed a Level 2 coaching accreditation course and a diploma of management. Shortly after retiring from playing, Guerra was appointed a part-time development coach at the Hawks in November 2013.

On 19 September 2014, Guerra joined Chelsea in the Mornington Peninsula Nepean Football League as player-coach. Prior to the 2016 season, he was appointed as a development coach with Fremantle. He departed from his role as development coach at the end of the 2019 season, after not being offered a new contract.

Off field
Guerra experienced male pattern balding at a young age and made headlines in late 2005 when he underwent a hair transplant cosmetic surgery procedure. He has said that the operation gave him confidence both on and off the field.

Guerra has a brother, Luke, who currently plays with Deer Park in the Western Region Football League.

Since retirement Guerra has revealed that he struggled with a gambling addiction whilst he was a professional footballer, a habit which cost him $400,000.

Statistics

|- style=background:#EAEAEA
| 2000 ||  || 34
| 10 || 4 || 4 || 57 || 17 || 74 || 17 || 10 || 0.4 || 0.4 || 5.7 || 1.7 || 7.4 || 1.7 || 1.0 || 0
|-
| 2001 ||  || 34
| 21 || 13 || 4 || 136 || 40 || 176 || 55 || 21 || 0.6 || 0.2 || 6.5 || 1.9 || 8.4 || 2.6 || 1.0 || 0
|- style=background:#EAEAEA
| 2002` ||  || 34
| 20 || 16 || 10 || 137 || 46 || 183 || 51 || 44 || 0.8 || 0.5 || 6.9 || 2.3 || 9.2 || 2.6 || 2.2 || 0
|-
| 2003` ||  || 34
| 14 || 6 || 5 || 75 || 37 || 112 || 28 || 21 || 0.4 || 0.4 || 5.4 || 2.6 || 8.0 || 2.0 || 1.5 || 0
|- style=background:#EAEAEA
| 2004^ ||  || 34
| 18 || 29 || 5 || 96 || 23 || 119 || 29 || 59 || 1.6 || 0.3 || 5.3 || 1.3 || 6.6 || 1.6 || 3.3 || 1
|-
| bgcolor=F0E68C | 2005# ||  || 34
| 13 || 15 || 10 || 72 || 31 || 103 || 33 || 41 || 1.2 || 0.8 || 5.5 || 2.4 || 7.9 || 2.5 || 3.2 || 2
|- style=background:#EAEAEA
| 2006 ||  || 18
| 15 || 3 || 2 || 184 || 91 || 275 || 84 || 27 || 0.2 || 0.1 || 12.3 || 6.1 || 18.3 || 5.6 || 1.8 || 0
|-
| 2007 ||  || 18
| 24 || 3 || 4 || 307 || 174 || 481 || 130 || 51 || 0.1 || 0.2 || 12.8 || 7.3 || 20.0 || 5.4 || 2.1 || 0
|- style=background:#EAEAEA
| bgcolor=F0E68C | 2008# ||  || 18
| 21 || 0 || 4 || 276 || 158 || 434 || 142 || 35 || 0.0 || 0.2 || 13.1 || 7.5 || 20.7 || 6.8 || 1.7 || 0
|-
| 2009 ||  || 18
| 16 || 5 || 2 || 172 || 137 || 309 || 68 || 40 || 0.3 || 0.1 || 10.8 || 8.6 || 19.3 || 4.3 || 2.5 || 1
|- style=background:#EAEAEA
| 2010 ||  || 18
| 23 || 1 || 6 || 271 || 160 || 431 || 93 || 63 || 0.0 || 0.3 || 11.8 || 7.0 || 18.7 || 4.0 || 2.7 || 1
|-
| 2011 ||  || 18
| 22 || 8 || 4 || 260 || 129 || 389 || 132 || 70 || 0.4 || 0.2 || 11.8 || 5.9 || 17.7 || 6.0 || 3.2 || 0
|- style=background:#EAEAEA
| 2012` ||  || 18
| 19 || 2 || 5 || 244 || 106 || 350 || 104 || 51 || 0.1 || 0.3 || 12.8 || 5.6 || 18.4 || 5.5 || 2.7 || 1
|-
| bgcolor=F0E68C | 2013`# ||  || 18
| 19 || 3 || 3 || 228 || 126 || 354 || 93 || 43 || 0.2 || 0.2 || 12.0 || 6.6 || 18.6 || 4.9 || 2.3 || 0
|- class="sortbottom"
! colspan=3| Career
! 255 !! 108 !! 68 !! 2515 !! 1275 !! 3790 !! 1059 !! 576 !! 0.4 !! 0.3 !! 9.9 !! 5.0 !! 14.9 !! 4.2 !! 2.3 !! 6
|}

Honours and achievements
Team
 2× AFL premiership player: 2008, 2013
 2× Minor premiership: 2002, 2003
 2× Minor premiership: 2012, 2013
 Pre-season premiership player: 2004
 3x  SANFL premiership player (Central District Bulldogs): 2000, 2001, 2003

Individual
 AFL Rising Star nominee: 2001
  life member

References

External links 

1982 births
Living people
Central District Football Club players
Hawthorn Football Club players
Hawthorn Football Club Premiership players
Port Adelaide Football Club players
Port Adelaide Football Club players (all competitions)
St Kilda Football Club players
Australian rules footballers from Victoria (Australia)
Bendigo Pioneers players
Devonport Football Club players
Two-time VFL/AFL Premiership players